Wilhelmshavener HV is a handball club from Wilhelmshaven, Germany. Currently, they compete in the 3. Liga.

The club has oscillated between the third division and the top tier throughout its history.

In September 2020 the managing director of WHV-Sportmarketing GmbH Maik Menninga, who is also the main sponsor, was remanded in custody; together with three other suspects, he is said to have cheated investors by 2.5 million euros. The offices of the association were then searched by the Würzburg public prosecutor's office. WHV-Sportmarketing GmbH filed for insolvency in October 2020.

Accomplishments
3. Liga: 2
: 2015, 2020

Team

Current squad
Squad for the 2022–23 season

Goalkeepers
 12  Levin Stasch
 51  Jakub Lefan

Left wingers
6  Sebastian Maas
  Corvin Troschke
Right wingers
 10  Okke Dröge
  Sergi Alá Sánchez
Line players
 44  Alexander Coßmann
 86  Gabriel Mišetić

Left backs
 13  Sven Eberlein
 29  Matej Kožul
 33  Tobias Schwolow
Centre backs
 21  Justin Herrmann
 24  Paul Hein
  Jonas Schweigart
Right backs
 74  Maximilian Mißling
 90  René Drechsler
  Ignacy Bąk

Transfers
Transfers for the 2022–23 season

 Joining
  Corvin Troschke (LW) (from  THW Kiel II)
  Jonas Schweigart (CB) (from  OHV Aurich)
  Ignacy Bąk (RB) (from  AC Diomidis Argous)
  Sergi Alá Sánchez (RW) (from  VfL Günzburg)

 Leaving
  Vedran Delić (LW) (to ?)
  Duje Maretić (RW) (to ?)

References

External links

German handball clubs
Handball-Bundesliga
Handball clubs established in 1995
1995 establishments in Germany
Sport in Lower Saxony